Baccarat or baccara is a card game played at casinos. It is a comparing card game played between two hands, the "player" and the "banker". Each baccarat coup (round of play) has three possible outcomes: "player" (player has the higher score), "banker", and "tie". There are three popular variants of the game: punto banco, baccarat chemin de fer, and baccarat banque (or à deux tableaux). In punto banco, each player's moves are forced by the cards the player is dealt. In baccarat chemin de fer and baccarat banque, by contrast, both players can make choices. The winning odds are in favour of the bank, with a house edge of at least 1 percent.

History 
The origins of the game are disputed, and some sources claim that it dates to the 19th century. Other sources claim that the game was introduced into France from Italy at the end of the 15th century by soldiers returning from the Italian Wars during the reign of Charles VIII.

Baccarat has been popular among the French nobility since the 19th century. During the Napoleonic era and before the legalization of casino gambling in 1907, people in France commonly played baccarat in private gaming rooms. Dating to this time period, Baccarat Banque is the earliest form of baccarat which is a three-person game and mentioned in Album des jeux by Charles Van-Tenac. Later, Chemin de Fer emerged as a two-person, zero-sum game from Baccarat Banque. Baccarat Punto Banco, in which the bettor bets on whether the Player or the Banker hand wins, was a significant change in the development of modern baccarat. It developed into a house-banked game in Havana in the 1940s, and is the most popular modern form.

American casinos are generating an increasing amount of their revenue from baccarat play. For example, in May 2012, Nevada only generated 18.3% of its total table gaming win from baccarat. However, in May 2013, this percentage increased to 33.1% and in May 2014 it rose to 45.2%.

Valuation of hands
In baccarat, cards have a point value: the 2 through 9 cards in each suit are worth face value (in points); the 10, jack, queen, and king have no point value (i.e. are worth zero); aces are worth 1 point; jokers are not used. Hands are valued modulo 10, i.e., according to the units digit of the sum of their constituent cards. For example, a hand consisting of 2 and 3 is worth 5, but a hand consisting of 6 and 7 is worth 3 (i.e., the 3 being the units digit in the combined points total of 13). The highest possible hand value in baccarat is therefore nine.

Versions

Punto banco
The overwhelming majority of casino baccarat games in the United States, United Kingdom, Canada, Australia, Sweden, Finland, and Macau are "punto banco" baccarat and they may be seen labelled simply as "Baccarat". In punto banco, the casino banks the game at all times, and commits to playing out both hands according to fixed drawing rules, known as the "tableau" (French: "board"), in contrast to more historic baccarat games where each hand is associated with an individual who makes drawing choices. The player (punto) and banker (banco) are simply designations for the two hands dealt out in each coup, two outcomes which the bettor can back; the player hand has no particular association with the gambler, nor the banker hand with the house.

Punto banco is dealt from a shoe containing 6 or 8 decks of cards shuffled together; a cut-card is placed in front of the seventh from last card, and the drawing of the cut-card indicates the last coup of the shoe. The dealer burns the first card face up and then based on its respective numerical value, with aces worth 1 and face cards worth 10, the dealer burns that many cards face down. For each coup, two cards are dealt face up to each hand, starting from "player" and alternating between the hands. The croupier may call the total (e.g., "five player, three banker"). If either the player or banker or both achieve a total of 8 or 9 at this stage, the coup is finished and the result is announced: a player win, a banker win, or tie. If neither hand has eight or nine, the drawing rules are applied to determine whether the player should receive a third card. Then, based on the value of any card drawn to the player, the drawing rules are applied to determine whether the banker should receive a third card. The coup is then finished, the outcome is announced, and winning bets are paid out.

Tableau of drawing rules
If neither the player nor the banker is dealt a total of 8 or 9 in the first two cards (known as a "natural"), the tableau is consulted, first for the player's rules, then the banker's.

 Player's rule
 If the player has an initial total of 5 or less, they draw a third card. If the player has an initial total of 6 or 7, they stand.

 Banker's rule
 If the player stood pat (i.e. has only two cards), the banker regards only their own hand and acts according to the same rule as the player, i.e. the banker draws a third card with hands 5 or less and stands with 6 or 7.
 If the player drew a third card, the banker acts according to the following more complex rules:
 If the banker total is 2 or less, they draw a third card regardless of what the player's third card is.
 If the banker total is 3, they draw a third card unless the player's third card is an 8.
 If the banker total is 4, they draw a third card if the player's third card is 2, 3, 4, 5, 6, or 7.
 If the banker total is 5, they draw a third card if the player's third card is 4, 5, 6, or 7.
 If the banker total is 6, they draw a third card if the player's third card is a 6 or 7.
 If the banker total is 7, they stand.

The croupier will deal the cards according to the tableau and the croupier will announce the winning hand, either the player or the banker. Losing bets will be collected and the winning bets will be paid according to the rules of the house. Usually, 1-to-1 even money will be paid on player bets and 19-to-20 on banker bets (even money with "5% commission to the house on the win").

Should both the player and banker have the same value at the end of the deal the croupier shall announce "égalité — tie bets win." All tie bets will be paid at 8-to-1 odds and all bets on player or banker remain in place and active for the next game (the customer may or may not be able to retract these bets depending on casino rules).

Casino provision

In the US, the full-scale version of punto banco is usually played at large tables in roped off areas or private rooms separated from the main gaming floor. The game is frequented by high rollers, who may wager tens or hundreds of thousands of dollars on a single hand. Minimum bets are relatively high, often starting at $100 and going as high as $500. Posted maximum bets are often arranged to suit a player. The table is staffed by a croupier, who directs the play of the game, and two dealers who calculate tax and collect and pay bets. Six or eight decks of cards are used, normally shuffled only by the croupier and dealers. The shoe is held by one of the players, who deals the cards on the instructions of the croupier according to the tableau. On a player win, the shoe moves either to the highest winning bettor, or to the next person in clockwise order around the table, depending on the casino's conventions. The shoe may be refused or the croupier may be requested to deal.

About 91% of total income from Macau casinos in 2014 came from punto banco.

Odds and strategy
Punto banco has both some of the lowest house edges among casino table games, and some of the highest. The player bet has an attractively low house edge of 1.24%, and the banker bet (despite the 5% commission on the win) is even lower, at 1.06%. Both are just slightly better for the player bet than chances at single-zero roulette, and comparable to playing blackjack without employing strategy.

In contrast, the tie bet which pays 8-to-1 has a high house edge of 14.4%. Most casinos in the United Kingdom pay the tie at 9-to-1, resulting in a more lenient house edge of approximately 4.85%.

While card counting, as employed in games such as blackjack, yields a relatively small advantage, if paired with a technique known as edge sorting baccarat players can obtain a significant edge versus the casino. This technique gained attention in 2012, when a UK casino refused to pay professional gambler Phil Ivey about $11 million, because he used edge sorting to gain an unfair advantage. Also in 2012, Ivey and a female companion won $9.6 million at the Borgata casino in Atlantic City using edge sorting and another $500,000 playing craps using his gains as a stake in the game. The Borgata paid him after his win, but then sued Ivey in 2014 after surveillance video showed he manipulated the dealer into rotating certain cards in the deck to exploit the flaw on the back of the cards. The Borgata prevailed and won $10.1 million, which Ivey refused to pay. In February 2019 the Borgata received approval from the US District Court in New Jersey to go after Ivey's assets in the state of Nevada, since he had no assets in the state of New Jersey to pursue. Ivey and the Borgata reached a settlement in July 2020.

House edge details (8 decks)

Variations
Mini-baccarat is a version of played on a small table with smaller minimums/maximums. It is popular with more casual players, particularly those from Asia.

A mini-baccarat variation where even money is paid on winning banker bets (rather than 95%), except when the banker wins with 6, which pay only 50% of the bet, goes under various names including Super 6 and Punto 2000. The house edge on a banker bet under Super 6 is 1.46% compared with regular commission baccarat at 1.058%. This is equivalent to increasing the commission by 17.45% to 5.87%. The banker wins with a 6 about five times every eight-deck shoe. As well as its increased house edge, the Super 6 variation is used by casinos for its speed, since it partially does away with the time-consuming process of calculating and collecting commission on winning banker bets except for winning with a 6.

In a similar variation called EZ-baccarat, even money is paid on both winning banker or player bets, except when the banker wins with a total of 7 after the third card is drawn, which results in a push on banker bets. The game has two additional options, the Dragon 7, a specific bet of a winning three-card 7 on the banker side, which pays 40-to-1 instead of pushing, and Panda 8, a bet of a winning three-card 8 on the player side, which pays 25-to-1.

Chemin de fer
Chemin de fer is a version which first appeared in the late 19th century. Its name, which is the French term for railway, comes from the version being quicker than the original game, the railway being at that time the fastest means of transport. It is still the most popular version in France.

Six decks of cards are used, shuffled together. Players are seated in random order, typically around an oval table; discarded cards go to the center. Play begins to the right of the croupier and continues counterclockwise.

Once play begins, one player is designated as the banker; this player also deals. The other players are "punters". The position of banker passes counterclockwise in the course of the game. In each round, the banker wagers the amount he wants to risk. The other players, in order, then declare whether they will "go bank", playing against the entire current bank with a matching wager. Only one player may "go bank". If no one "goes bank", players make their wagers in order. If the total wagers from the players are less than the bank, observing bystanders may also wager up to the amount of the bank. If the total wagers from the players are greater than the bank, the banker may choose to increase the bank to match; if he does not, the excess wagers are removed in reverse play order.

The banker deals four cards face down: two to himself and two held in common by the remaining players. The player with the highest individual wager (or first in play order if tied for highest wager) is selected to represent the group of non-banker players. The banker and player both look at their cards; if either has an eight or a nine, this is immediately announced and the hands are turned face-up and compared. If neither hand is an eight or nine, the player has a choice to accept or refuse a third card; if accepted, it is dealt face-up. Traditional practice – grounded in mathematics, similar to basic strategy in blackjack, but further enforced via social sanctions by the other individuals whose money is at stake – dictates that one always accept a card if one's hand totals between 0 and 4, inclusive, and always refuse a card if one's hand totals 6 or 7. After the player makes his decision, the banker, in turn, decides either to accept or to refuse another card. Once both the banker and the representative player have made their decision, the hands are turned face-up and compared.

If the player's hand exceeds the banker's hand when they are compared, each wagering player receives back their wager and a matching amount from the bank, and the position of banker passes to the next player in order. If the banker's hand exceeds the player's hand, all wagers are forfeit and placed into the bank, and the banker position does not change. If there is a tie, wagers remain as they are for the next hand.

If the banker wishes to withdraw, the new banker is the first player in order willing to stake an amount equal to the current bank total. If no one is willing to stake this amount, the new banker is instead the next player in order, and the bank resets to whatever that player wishes to stake. Many games have a set minimum bank or wager amount.

Baccarat banque
In Baccarat banque the position of banker is more permanent compared to Chemin de fer. The shoe contains three inter-shuffled decks. The banker, unless they retire either of their own free will or by reason of the exhaustion of their finances, holds office until all these cards have been dealt.

The bank is at the outset put up to auction, i.e. is given to the player who will undertake to risk the largest amount. In some circles, the person who has first set down their name on the list of players has the right to hold the first bank, risking such amount as they may think proper.

The right to begin having been ascertained, the banker takes their place midway down one of the sides of an oval table, the croupier facing them, with the discard area between. On either side of the banker are the punters (ten such constituting a full table). Any other persons desiring to take part remain standing, and can only play in the event of the amount in the bank for the time being not being covered by the seated players.

The croupier, having shuffled the cards, hands them for the same purpose to the players to the right and left, the banker being entitled to shuffle them last, and to select the person by whom they shall be cut. Each punter having made their stake, the banker deals three cards, the first to the player on their right, the second to the player on their left, and the third to themself; then three more in like manner. The five punters on the right (and any bystanders staking with them) win or lose by the cards dealt to that side; the five others by the cards dealt to the left side. The rules as to turning up with eight or nine, offering and accepting cards, and so on, are the same as Chemin de fer.

Each punter continues to hold the cards for their side so long as they win or tie. If they lose, the next hand is dealt to the player next following them in rotation.

Any player may "go bank", the first claim to do so belonging to the punter immediately on the right of the banker; the next to the player on his left, and so on alternatively in regular order. If two players on opposite sides desire to "go bank", they go half shares.

A player going bank may either do so on a single hand, in the ordinary course, or a cheval, i.e. on two hands separately, one-half of the stake being played upon each hand. A player going bank and losing may again go bank, and if they again lose, may go bank a third time, but not further.

A player undertaking to hold the bank must play out one hand, but may retire at any time afterwards. On retiring, they are bound to state the amount with which they retire. It is then open to any other player (in order of rotation) to continue the bank, starting with the same amount and dealing from the remainder of the pack used by their predecessor. The outgoing banker takes the place previously occupied by their successor.

The breaking of the bank does not deprive the banker of the right to continue, provided that they have funds with which to replenish it, up to the agreed minimum.

Should the stakes of the punters exceed the amount for the time being in the bank, the banker is not responsible for the amount of such excess. In the event of their losing, the croupier pays the punters in order of rotation, so far as the funds in the bank will extend; beyond this, they have no claim. The banker may, however, in such a case, instead of resting on his right, declare the stakes accepted, putting up the needed funds to meet them. In such event the bank thenceforth becomes unlimited, and the banker must hold all stakes (to whatever amount) offered on any subsequent hand, or give up the bank.

Macao
David Parlett considers Macao as the immediate precursor to baccarat. Its name and rules suggest it may have been brought over by sailors returning from Asia where similar card games have been played since the early 17th century such as San zhang, Oicho-Kabu, and Gabo japgi. Macao appeared in Europe at the end of the 18th century and was popular for all classes. Its notoriety led to King Victor-Amadeus III banning it in all his realms in 1788. It was the most popular game in Watier's, an exclusive gentlemen's club in London, where it led to the ruin of Beau Brummell. The match in Arthur Schnitzler's 1926 novella Night Games (Spiel im Morgengrauen) contains instructions for Macao under the name of baccarat. Its popularity in the United States waned after the early 20th century. The game still has a following in Continental Europe, especially in Russia.

Macao uses two decks of cards shuffled together. Punters place their bets (within the agreed limits) against the banker. Initially, one card is dealt clockwise and face down to every player by the banker. The punters' objective is to beat the banker's card value or risk losing their bet. In case of a tie, whoever has the same value with fewer cards wins. The banker wins if there is a tie in both value and number of cards (in an early version, all bets are off). Any punter who receives a natural 9 receives triple the amount of the bet as long as the banker does not have a natural 9 too. Winning with a natural 8 awards double while winning with a 7 or under is only equal to the bet. Players can request additional cards which are dealt face up; if it is a ten or a face card, they can reject it and ask for another. In an early version of this game, going over 9 with extra cards amounts to a "bust" as in blackjack, later versions use modulo 10 arithmetic as in the other games. Beating the banker with a pair only awards an equal amount to the bet. When the deck is exhausted, the player to the banker's left becomes the new banker.

Victoria is a variation of macao where players are initially dealt two cards. Like macao and baccarat, it was banned in Russia during the 19th century though their rules continued to be printed in game books.

In popular culture

Royal baccarat scandal

The Tranby Croft affair in 1891 and disgraced socialite William Gordon Cumming's subsequent lawsuit were  known together as the royal baccarat scandal, due to the involvement of the future King Edward VII. Since the Prince of Wales was involved in the incident, it inspired a huge amount of media interest in the game, bringing baccarat to the attention of the public at large. Accounts of the scandal in newspapers also included the rules for the game. The scandal became the subject of music hall songs and a stage play.

A Hard Day's Night
In the 1964 Richard Lester comedy A Hard Day's Night, Paul McCartney's "grandfather" John (played by Wilfrid Brambell) steals an invite to a posh casino intended for the band, and has a run of luck at a baccarat table despite appearing not to know how to play the game; at one point, upon winning a bet, he yells "Bingo," to which the croupier corrects him, thinking he meant to proclaim "Banco."

James Bond
Baccarat chemin-de-fer is the favoured game of James Bond, the fictional secret agent created by Ian Fleming. Bond plays the game in numerous novels, most notably his 1953 debut, Casino Royale, in which the entire plot revolves around a game between Bond and SMERSH trade union operative Le Chiffre; the unabridged version of the novel includes a primer to the game for readers who are unfamiliar with it. It is also featured in several filmed versions of the character, including the 1954 television adaptation of Casino Royale, where Bond bankrupts Le Chiffre in order to have him eliminated by his Soviet superiors; Dr. No, where Bond is first introduced while playing the game in film; Thunderball; the 1967 version of Casino Royale, which is the most detailed treatment of a baccarat game in any Bond film; On Her Majesty's Secret Service; For Your Eyes Only; and GoldenEye.

In the 2006 movie adaptation of Casino Royale, baccarat is replaced by Texas hold 'em poker, largely due to the poker boom at the time of filming.

Rush Hour 3
In 2007's Rush Hour 3, main characters James Carter and Geneviève first meet playing baccarat in a casino in Paris. Initially, Carter can not afford to play, but Geneviève covers for him. Unsure of the rules of the game, Carter thinks that he has a good hand, not knowing that he instead has zero points. The dealer explains the situation, and Geneviève wins.

Bob le flambeur
The 1956 French heist film Bob le flambeur features a climactic sequence in which the protagonist begins gambling as a heist is taking place. He encounters extraordinary luck playing chemin de fer, which leads him to lose track of time.

References

Banking games
Baccarat
French gambling games
American gambling games